Evil Hours is a suspense novel penned by author Raymond Benson, published by Twenty First Century Publishers Ltd. in 2004.  It was originally published as an e-book by PublishingOnline.com in 2001.  Benson is primarily known as the author of several James Bond continuation novels.

References

2004 American novels
American thriller novels